13 Rajab is the thirteenth day of the seven month (Rajab) of the Islamic calendar.

In the conventional Lunar Hijri calendar, this day is the 190th day of the year.

Births

 23 before Hijrah – Ali ibn Abi Talib, the first Imam of the Shiites, the fourth caliph of Islam, born in the year of 23 before Hijrah of Muhammad the founder of the world religion of Islam, 30th year after the Year of the Elephant (13 September 601)
 1344 AH – Abdul-Karim Mousavi Ardebili, an Iranian reformist politician and Twelver Shi'a marja (28 January 1926)
 1348 AH – Seyyed Mohammad Ali Rowzati, Shiite bibliographer and translator (15 December 1929)

Deaths
 279 AH – Mohammad ibn Isa Tirmidhi, a Persian Islamic scholar and collector of hadith (9 October 892)
 1327 AH – Sheikh Fazlollah Noori, a prominent Shia Muslim scholar and theorist (31 July 1909)
 1435 AH – Mohammad Baqer Shirazi, an Iranian Twelver Shi'a Marja (13 May 2014)

Holidays and observances
 The beginning of the white days of the month of Rajab
 The beginning of the Iʿtikāf three days Islamic ceremony in Iran
 Father's Day, on the occasion of the birth of Ali ibn Abi Talib, in Iran, Pakistan, Mauritania, Somalia and Sudan

See also
 19 Ramadan
 21 Ramadan
 23 Ramadan

References

Islamic calendar